George Charles Butte (May 9, 1877 – January 18, 1940) was an American attorney, U.S. Army officer, educator, jurist, and Republican politician who served as an associate justice of the Supreme Court of the Philippines. He was also a candidate in the 1924 Texas gubernatorial election, running against Ma Ferguson. He also served as attorney general (1925-1928) and acting governor of Puerto Rico (1927-1928). He was an alumnus of Austin College, and studied at the University of Texas, the University of Berlin, Heidelberg University and the Ecole de Droit.

References

1940 deaths
United States Army officers
1877 births
Texas Republicans
American lawyers
Puerto Rican lawyers
Austin College alumni
Heidelberg University alumni
University of Texas alumni
American expatriates in Germany
American expatriates in the Philippines
American expatriates in France
Associate Justices of the Supreme Court of the Philippines